Events in the year 1708 in Norway.

Incumbents
Monarch: Frederick IV

Events
10 April - Johan Vibe is appointed Vice Steward of Norway.

Arts and literature

Births

9 September – Paul Egede, theologian, missionary, and scholar (d. 1789)
10 September - Mathias Collett, civil servant (d. 1759).
16 September – Catharina Freymann, pietist leader (d. 1791)

Deaths
28 October – Prince George of Denmark and Norway (born 1653)
25 December - Jørgen Thormøhlen, merchant, ship owner and industrialist (born c. 1640).

See also

References